Blek le Rat (born Xavier Prou, 1952) is a French graffiti artist. He was one of the first graffiti artists in Paris, and has been described as the "Father of stencil graffiti".

Early life

Xavier Prou was born on 15 November 1951 in Boulogne-Billancourt in the western suburbs of Paris.

Early career and influence

Blek began his artwork in 1981, painting stencils of rats on the walls of Paris streets. He described the rat as "the only free animal in the city", and one which "spreads the plague everywhere, just like street art". His name originates from the comic book Blek le Roc, using "rat" as an anagram for "art".

Initially influenced by the early graffiti-art of New York City after a visit in 1971, he chose a style which he felt better suited Paris, due to the differing architecture of the two cities. He also recognised the influence of Canadian artist Richard Hambleton, who painted large-scale human figures in the 1980s. In 1985, he was on the first meeting of the graffiti and urban art movement in Bondy (France), on the VLP's . Blek's oldest preserved street art graffito, a 1991 replica of Caravaggio's Madonna di Loreta, which he dedicated to his future wife Sybille, was rediscovered behind posters on a house wall in Leipzig, Germany, in 2012.

French authorities identified Blek in 1991 when he was arrested while stencilling a replica of Caravaggio's Madonna and Child, with the connection to Blek and his artwork being made by police. From that point on, he has worked exclusively with pre-stenciled posters, citing the speedier application of the medium to walls, as well as lessened punishment should he be caught in the act.

He has had a great influence on  graffiti-art and "guerilla-art" movements, the main motivation of his work being social consciousness and the desire to bring art to the people. Many of his pieces are pictorials of solitary individuals in opposition to larger, oppressive groups. In 2006 he began his series of images representing the homeless, which depict them standing, sitting, or lying on sidewalks, in attempts to bring attention to what he views as a global problem.

Influence on and opinion of Banksy

British graffiti artist Banksy and Blek have expressed mutual desire for collaboration; in 2011, Blek was seen adding to a mural begun the previous year by Banksy in the Mission District, San Francisco.
Blek's work is hugely influential to the present generation of street artists, as alluded to by Banksy, stating: "Every time I think I've painted something slightly original, I find out that Blek Le Rat has done it as well. Only twenty years earlier".

Exhibitions

In October 2003, Blek le Rat had his first solo U.K. exhibition in London at the Leonard Street Gallery. He participated in the Cans Festival in 2008, which featured outdoor street stencil painting in Waterloo, London.

His American gallery debut took place at Subliminal Projects Gallery in Los Angeles in 2008. It included paintings, silkscreen, and three-dimensional artwork, as well as photography from his wife, Sybille Prou.

Blek also had an exhibition in December 2009 at the Metro Gallery in Melbourne, a centre of street art in Australia. The exhibition entitled "Le Ciel Est Bleu, La Vie Est Belle" (The sky is blue, life is beautiful), featured wooden panels, canvas, screen-print, and photographs, tracing the artist's oeuvre from the early 1980s to the present.

Blek le Rat has nonetheless expressed preference for the streets over galleries, stating the integrity of an artist is to be seen by as many people as possible, not being sold or recognized in a museum.

In 2014, Blek le Rat exhibited 3 large-scale original paintings and an edition of 25 unique monotypes with lithography in a setting that bridges these traditional spaces—the Quin hotel in New York City—as part of the hotel's Quin Arts program. The artist created the lithographs at the New York Academy of Art during his tenure as artist in residence at the Quin hotel. Collectively entitled "Escaping Paris," the exhibit was curated by DK Johnston of The Arts Fund. The Quin's permanent collection also includes Blek le Rat's "Love America" on the 14th floor and loaned works the "Great Wedding" on the second floor, "What Has Been Seen Cannot Be Unseen" in the boardroom, and "Tango" in the lobby. Most recently, Blek le Rat commemorated this collaboration on the Quin's façade with an image of Andy Warhol.

See also

 Banksy
 Shepard Fairey
 Tavar Zawacki
 King Robbo
 List of urban artists
 Street art

References

Further reading
 Stencil Graffiti by Tristan Manco. Thames & Hudson (2002). 
 Blek le Rat – Getting Through the Walls by Sybille Prou and King Adz. Thames & Hudson (2008). 
 Blek le Rat: 30 Year Anniversary Retrospective. Art Publishing Limited. (2011).

External links

 
 2013 Interview, Boygirl Magazine
 Curbs and Stoops Interview
 Grafiteros – ElPais.com
 Fecal Face interview (04/2008)
 Canned Goods – Blek Le Rat Interview (September '08)
 "Blek Le Rat" The 30 Year Anniversary Retrospective (2011)

French graffiti artists
Living people
1952 births
Pseudonymous artists
Artists from Paris